Martial Francis (born 10 January 1953) is a Saint Lucian cricketer. He played in sixteen first-class matches for the Windward Islands from 1969 to 1973.

See also
 List of Windward Islands first-class cricketers

References

External links
 

1953 births
Living people
Saint Lucian cricketers
Windward Islands cricketers